Oxantel is an anthelmintic. It has typically been used in human and animal medicine as a treatment for intestinal worms.

Oxantel has been shown to inhibit fumarate reductase in some pathogenic bacteria.

References 

Antiparasitic agents
Phenols
Alkene derivatives
Pyrimidines